The 1910 Texas Longhorns football team represented the University of Texas at Austin in the 1910 college football season. In their first year under head coach Billy Wasmund, the Longhorns compiled a 6–2 and outscored opponents by a collective total of 162 to 42.

The game against Baylor ended in a forfeit when Baylor left in the third quarter, with the score tied 6–6, due to a dispute with the referee.

Schedule

References

Texas
Texas Longhorns football seasons
Texas Longhorns football